Boris Johansson is a Swedish former footballer who played as a forward for Djurgårdens IF.

Honours
Djurgårdens IF
 Allsvenskan (1): 1964

References

Living people
Association football forwards
Swedish footballers
Allsvenskan players
Djurgårdens IF Fotboll players
Year of birth missing (living people)